The Most Beautifullest Hits is a greatest hits compilation by the hip hop artist Keith Murray.

Background
The compilation has songs from Murray's first three albums, as well as Redman's Dare Iz a Darkside, Erick Sermon's No Pressure, LL Cool J's Mr. Smith and Def Squad's El Niño.

In a similar manner to Murray's previous album, It's a Beautiful Thing, the greatest hits compilation was an attempt by Jive Records to capitalize on Murray's success while he was incarcerated - despite Murray's disapproval. The majority of the production was done by Erick Sermon, showing how he and Murray were an inseparable team.

Tracklist

References

Albums produced by Erick Sermon
Albums produced by J Dilla
1999 greatest hits albums
Jive Records compilation albums